This list presents the members of the Madrid Municipal Council in the 2003–2007 period, including substitutes:

References